George Allan (1767–1828) was an English barrister and politician.

Life
The son of George Allan (1736–1800) and his wife Anne Nicholson, he was born at Darlington; he was sent to Hertford Grammar School, under John Carr. He matriculated  at Trinity College, Cambridge in 1785, and graduated B.A. there in 1789. He was called to the bar in 1790 at the Middle Temple, which he had joined in 1785.

Allan resided at Blackwell Grange. He withdrew as a candidate for Durham in the 1818 general election, not long before the poll. He became a fellow of the Society of Antiquaries of London in 1813.

Notes

1767 births
1828 deaths
English barristers
Members of the Parliament of the United Kingdom for City of Durham
Fellows of the Society of Antiquaries of London
UK MPs 1812–1818
People from Darlington